Lily Marie Louise Carlstedt, later Kelsby (March 5, 1926 – June 14, 2002), was a Danish athlete who competed mainly in javelin throwing.

She competed for Denmark in the 1948 Summer Olympics held in London, where she won a bronze medal in javelin and in the 1952 Summer Olympics held in Helsinki, where she beat the Olympic Record.

References

 

1926 births
2002 deaths
Danish female javelin throwers
Athletes (track and field) at the 1948 Summer Olympics
Athletes (track and field) at the 1952 Summer Olympics
Olympic athletes of Denmark
Olympic bronze medalists for Denmark
Medalists at the 1948 Summer Olympics
Olympic bronze medalists in athletics (track and field)